
"Lenihan" is an Irish surname. Variants include "Lenighan”, "Lenegan", “Lenahan”, and "Lennihan." People with the name include:

A Roscommon family of this name, in Irish O Leanachain, appears in early records, the most notable of whom was Maelciaran O'Lenechan of Tuamna, in Boyle barony, a priest very highly praised in the "Annals of Loch Ce" and by the Four Masters for his numerous good qualities: he died in 1249. Little is heard of them in modern times. Kinehan or Lenihan as it is also spelt, is now regarded as belonging primarily to Counties Limerick and Tipperary. Maurice Lenihan (1811–1895), author of the History of Limerick, is the most notable bearer of the name.

Lenihan, Lenehan, Lenahan, and Linehan are anglicized versions of the Irish Ó Leanachain, possibly from leanach, meaning "sorrowful". It appears to have arisen separately in two localities, in County Roscommon in the west, and in the south in the Limerick/Tipperary region. Bearers of the surname are found in both areas today, but it is most common in the south. Although born in Waterford, Maurice Lenihan (1811–1895) is closely associated with his adopted city of Limerick. A campaigning nationalist journalist, he was editor and proprietor of the Limerick Reporter for more than 40 years and is now best remembered as the author of Limerick: Its History and Antiquities (1860). The most prominent contemporaries of the name are Brian Lenihan (1924–1992) and his younger sister Mrs. Mary O'Rourke, of the Roscommon family, who both served in a variety of ministerial positions in the Irish government from the 1970s through to the 1990s.

Lenaghan
Quite numerous: Down etc. See Lenihan.
Leneghan
rare: Mayo, Down. See Lenihan.
Lenehan
numerous: Midlands, Mayo-Sligo etc. See Lenihan.
Lenihan
numerous: all areas except Ulster, mainly Kerry-Clare-W Limerick-Cork. The Irish is (1) Ó Leannacháin (2) Ó Luingeacháin. The former relates to a Roscommon sept; the latter to Munster and comes, according to Woulfe, from earlier Mac Longacháin where longach may be gluttonous, avid. Note the variants. IF & SGG.
Ó Leannacháin
Lenihan: líon beag: Connachta & Lár na Tíre. Clann ó Ros Comáin go bhfuil athleagain Ó Léanacháin & Ó Lionacháin orthu. Féach Ó Loingeacháin & Ó Longacháin, leis. Féach Mac Leannacháin thuas

Athletes
 Donal Lenihan (born 1959), a retired Irish rugby union player
 John Lenihan, Irish 1991 World Champion in Mountain Running (in Switzerland)
 Karl Lenihan, former Gaelic football player
 Darragh Lenihan, Irish professional football player

People in the arts
 Edmund Lenihan (born 1950), an Irish author
 Winifred Lenihan (1898–1964), an American actress, writer and director
 Graham Linehan  (born 1968), Irish writer and director (Father Ted)

Politicians
 Brian Lenihan Snr (1930–1995), an Irish Fianna Fáil politician
 Brian Lenihan Jnr (1959–2011), an Irish Fianna Fáil politician
 Conor Lenihan (born 1963), an Irish Fianna Fáil politician
 J. Michael Lenihan (1943–2015), Rhode Island state senator
 Mary O'Rourke (née Lenihan; born 1937), an Irish Fianna Fáil politician
 Patrick Lenihan (1902–1970), a Fianna Fáil politician

Officers
 Michael Joseph Lenihan (1865-1958), a US-army general in World War I

Scientists
 J. M. A. Lenihan FRSE (1918-1993) British clinical physicist

Religious leaders
 George Michael Lenihan OSB (1858–1910, fifth Catholic Bishop of Auckland (1896–1910)
 Thomas Mathias Lenihan (1843–1901), a late-19th- and early-20th-century American Catholic bishop

See also
 James J. Lenihan Dam, an earthen dam across the Los Gatos Creek creating the Lexington Reservoir in the Santa Cruz Mountains of Santa Clara County, California
 Maurice Lenihan (1811-1895), Mayor of Limerick in 1884 and best known as the author of the monumental History of Limerick which he published in 1866.
 Lenehan

Surnames of Irish origin